The Frauen DFB-Pokal 2002–03 was the 23rd season of the cup competition, Germany's second-most important title in women's football. The first round of the competition began on 17 August 2002. In the final which was held in Berlin on 31 May 2003 FFC Frankfurt defeated FCR 2001 Duisburg 1–0, thus claiming their fifth title, all consecutive.

First round

Second round

Quarter-finals

Semi-finals

In the semi-finals FSV Frankfurt hosted local rivals FFC Frankfurt for the third time in a row, losing as in both games before.

Final

DFB-Pokal Frauen seasons
Pokal
Fra